This is a list of animals that live in the Galápagos Islands. The fauna of the Galápagos Islands include a total of 9,000 confirmed species. Of them, none have been introduced by humans, and seventeen are endemic.

Mammals

Rodents
Galápagos rice rat, (Aegialomys galapagoensis)
Santiago Galapagos mouse, (Nesoryzomys swarthi)
Fernandina rice rat, (Nesoryzomys fernandinae)

Pinnipeds
Galápagos fur seal,  (Arctocephalus galapagoensis)
Galápagos sea lion, (Zalophus wollebaeki)

Bats
Hoary bat, (Lasiurus cinereus)

Cetaceans
Blainville's beaked whale, (Mesoplodon densirostris)
Common bottlenose dolphin, (Tursiops truncatus)
Cuvier's beaked whale, (Ziphius cavirostris)

Reptiles
Galápagos tortoise
Green sea turtle
Marine iguana
Galápagos land iguana
Galápagos pink land iguana
Santa Fe land iguana
Lava lizard
Galapagos racer
Yellow-bellied sea snake

Birds
American flamingo
American yellow warbler
Blue-footed booby
Brown noddy
Brown pelican
Cattle egret
Darwin's finches
Flightless cormorant
Galápagos dove
Galápagos flycatcher
Galapagos shearwater
Galapagos martin
Galápagos hawk
Galápagos penguin
Great blue heron
Great egret
Great frigatebird
Lava gull
Lava heron
Magnificent frigatebird
Nazca booby
Osprey
Peregrine falcon
Red-billed tropicbird
Red-footed booby
Striated heron
Swallow-tailed gull
Waved albatross
Yellow-crowned night heron
Galapagos mockingbird
Hood mockingbird
Floreana mockingbird 
San Cristobal mockingbird
Galapagos rail

Fish
Galápagos damsel
Scalloped hammerhead shark
Whitetip reef shark
Red-lipped or Galápagos batfish
Spotted eagle ray
Golden cownose ray
Razor surgeon fish
King angelfish
Galapagos reef fish
Whale shark
Galapagos shark

Insects

Beetles — Coleoptera 
There are around 200 beetle species including:

 Stenodontes molarius
 Calosoma
 Trox suberosus
 Gersteckeria
 Cicindela

Ants, bees and wasps — Hymenoptera 
There are about twenty native ant species, a few wasps and only one bee in the Galápagos, including:
 Carpenter ant (Camponotus sp.)
 The introduced little fire ant (Wasmannia)

 Carpenter bee (Xylocopa darwini)

Butterflies and moths — Lepidoptera 
Eight species of butterfly and many species of moth are known from the Galápagos.
 Galápagos sulphur butterfly (Phoebis sennae marcellina)
 Galápagos silver fritillary (Agraulis vanillae galapagensis)
 Painted ladies (two species, Vanessa carye and V. virginiensis)
 Monarch butterfly
 Queen butterfly (Danaus gilippus)
 Galápagos blue butterfly (Leptotes parrhasioides)
 Large-tailed skipper (Urbanus dorantes)
 Green hawkmoth (Eumorpha labruscae)
 Hawkmoth (Hyles lineata florilega)
 Rustic sphinx (Manduca rustica calapagensis)
 Footmen moths (Utetheisa spp.)
 Noctuid moth (Ascalapha odorata)

Grass insects 
 Praying mantis (Galapagia solitaria)
 Grasshoppers, locusts, katydids and crickets—Orthoptera

Other arthropods 
 Galápagos scorpion (Centruroides exsul)
 Common yellow scorpion (Hadruroides lunatus)
 Several species of centipedes, including  (Scolopendra galapagensis)
 Sally Lightfoot crab (Grapsus grapsus)
Over fifty species of spiders, including the giant crab spider (Heteropoda venatoria), the smaller Selenops, the endemic Lathrodectes apicalis, Argiope argentata and Neoscona oaxacensis (syn. N. cooksoni)

References and sources 

 
 
 
 

Galapagos Islands